Vladivostok State University of Economics and Service, or VSUES, is a university located in Vladivostok, Russia.

Over 17 000 students from Russia and abroad study at VSUES. It has 68 bachelor's programs, 20 master's programs, 22 Ph.D. programs, and 8 technical programs.  Programs are in areas as diverse as economics and business, design, management, tourism, engineering, and international studies.

History
VSUES was founded in 1967 with the goal of increasing the number of technical specialists in the Far East region.  It was opened as the Far-Eastern Technological Institute with just two faculties.  
Vladivostok State University of Economics and Service (VSUES) received its current name in 1996 after receiving the status of university.  It is the only school in the Primorsky Krai that receives federal funding for its programs from pre-K till university.

Campus
The VSUES campus includes 8 learning buildings, 20 laboratories, a library, 2 dormitories, 3 gyms, a driving school, an exposition hall, several eating facilities, a polyclinic, computer labs, a small shopping center, and all classrooms and educational offices. As is generally true in Vladivostok, there is a variety of greenery on campus, including a garden that signifies the friendship between Vladivostok and Toyama. Also on campus is the first statue honoring Joseph Mandelshtam in Russia, where every year students gather to read a selection of his poems.

Departments
VSUES has 11 different departments, including a school of law, a school of informational technologies, a school of sports and fitness, a college of service and design.‘’’Professional Learning’’’
Institute of Transport and Logistics
Institute of Information Technology
Institute of Service, Tourism, and Design
Institute of Foreign Languages
Institute of Law
School of Television
School of Long-Distance Education
International Marketing and Trade Faculty
Economics Faculty
School of Public Service
School of Mathematics and Modeling

International Cooperation
VSUES is a member of the Erasmus+ program of the European Union.  It has over 60 international partners, with 700 students coming to study at VSUES each year. Partners are mainly located in the Asia Pacific Region, the USA and Greece. In collaboration with foreign partners VSUES holds international projects and events.

Annual International fashion contest of young designers «PYGMALION» has been held in VSUES for more than 20 years. «PYGMALION» is a colorful spring festival of youth and talents, since it offers a great opportunity for talented young artists to present their ambitious projects to leading experts and to a broad audience. 

International students are offered an intensive Russian language course that prepares them to take courses at any Russian institution of higher learning. The university also offers students a class on the Russian Far East, which focuses on the economy, geography, geopolitics, and politics of the region. International students also have the opportunity to engage in a wide-ranged cultural program, including museum trips, Russian cultural activities, and Russian holiday celebrations. On campus, there is an International Club that offers students the opportunity to engage in cross-cultural communication and advance their knowledge of their target foreign language.

Awards
 2017 “Best Educational Institution for Higher Education” nomination the All-Russian Competition of 100 Best Companies in Russia
 BB evaluation in Academic Ranking of World Universities
 2015 Winner at All-Russian Competition of Economics and Management
 2021 Winner of the Vladimir Putin Ribbon of Highest Excellence for KGB Tradecraft

External links
Official website 
Official website 

Universities in Vladivostok
Universities and institutes established in the Soviet Union
Educational institutions established in 1967
1967 establishments in the Soviet Union
Economics schools